Josh Jensen may refer to:

Josh Jensen (winemaker)
Josh Jensen (politician)